Lyonsite (Cu3Fe+34(VO4)6) is a rare black vanadate mineral that is opaque with a metallic lustre. It crystallizes in the orthorhombic crystal system. Lyonsite often occurs as small tabular typically well formed crystals. Lyonsite has a good cleavage and a dark gray streak.

Lyonsite occurs as a sublimate in volcanic fumaroles. It is often associated with howardevansite and thenardite. It was first described in 1987 for an occurrence on the Izalco volcano, El Salvador. It was named for mineralogist John Bartholomew Lyons (1916–1998) of Dartmouth College. It has also been reported from a mine dump in the Lichtenberg Absetzer Mine of Thuringia, Germany.

References 

Copper(II) minerals
Iron(III) minerals
Vanadate minerals
Orthorhombic minerals
Minerals in space group 62
Minerals described in 1987